Jalaja or Natya Mahimai is a 1938 Indian Tamil-language dance film written by Manjeri S. Isvaran, Dr. V. Raghavan and G. K. Seshagiri. The film was directed by R. R. Gautam and G. K. Seshagiri and produced by Sagar Renaissance Theatre. It stars Bhanumathi, Lakshmi, G. K. Seshagiri and K. S. Gopalakrishan in lead roles. The film is marked as India's first dance film. It is also dedicated to Bhanumathi’s cousin, Bharatanatya Art Expert Srimathi Varalakshmi, who died early on in the film’s production. No print of the film is known to survive, making it a lost film.

Plot

Cast 
Cast according to the song book

 Bhanumathi as Jalaja
 G. K. Seshagiri as Rajagopalan
 Lakshmi as Lalitha
  K. S. Gopalakrishan as Mudaliar
 Janaki as Duraikannu
 V. Ganesa Iyer as Priest
 Rukmini as Rukmini
 M. K. Venkatapathy as Azhagappan
 R. Venkatachalamaiah as Sivarama Iyer
 S. R. Krishna Iyengar as Kittu

 R. Ramanujachari as Agent Iyengar
 Bhudo Advani, Vaithi, Sadasivan as Mudaliar’s Servants
 Pankajam as Pankajam
 Kokilam as Singer
 K. S. Ramamurthi as Station Master
 S. Rajagopalan as Sundaram
 Sripada Shankar as Police Deputy Commissioner
 M. Viswanathan as Police Inspector
 G. Kalyanasundaram as Police Inspector
 A. Sundaram as Police Inspectors

Production 
The film was produced by Sagar Renaissance Theatre, and directed by R. R. Gautam and G. K. Seshagiri. Manjeri S. Isvaran and R. S. Murthi were assistant directors. The story and dialogues were written by Manjeri S. Isvaran, Dr. V. Raghavan and G. K. Seshagiri. The photography was handled by Rajnikant Pandya and Minoo Billimoria. The audiography was done by V. M. Desai, Dinshaw Billimoria and Reuben Moses. Roora Mistry took care of the film’s settings while Fakir Mohammad handled the editing. The film was processed by Gangadhar Narvekar and Pranchavan Shukla. While the song book only credits S. Shanmugam as the Nattuvanar in the orchestra, Film News Anandan credits him as just the dance choreographer. Hari Krishnan believes that S. Shanmugam is actually Shanmugasundara Nattuvanar of Thiruppanandal, who was an associate of Vadivelu Pilai, the duo’s choreographer before he died in 1937. G. K. Seshagiri played the hero, Rajagopalan, while Varalakshmi of the Varalakshmi-Bhanumathi duo was hired to play the heroine, Jalaja. Production began in 1937 in Bombay and on 3 November, Varalakshmi died suddenly. Her cousin Bhanumathi, also known as Kumbakonam Bhanumathi, was asked to replace her role, which she accepted. The film had a second title, Natya Mahimai, meaning the glory of dance. K. S. Gopalakrishnan, a congress party worker turned film director played the Mudaliar. He is often confused with another film director, K. S. Gopalakrishnan. Bhudo Advani, a Bengali actor played one of the Mudaliar’s servants. Kumari Rukmani played Rukmini, Jalaja’s younger sister. Lakshmi, who played Rajagopalan’s wife, Lalitha, was introduced in this film.

Soundtrack 
The music was directed by A. N. Kalyanasundaram, who also composed most of the songs. However, two classical songs in the film were composed by Ramalinga Swamigal and Muthu Thandavar respectively. The song, "Aduvum Seivar", is an altered version of the padam, "Aduvum Solluval" composed by Subbarama Iyer.

A. N. K’s Orchestra
 Parur S. Anantharaman (Conductor) – Fiddle 
 V. Natarajan – Fiddle
 M. R. Jayarama Sarma – Flute, Harmonium
 M. Balusami Dikshithar – Veenai
 Ponnusami Mudaliar – Gottuvadhyam
 S. Radhakrishnan – Organ, Piano, Xylophone
 M. K. Venkatapathy – Mridangam
 C. V. Mani – Mridangam, Tabla, Dholak
 S. Shanmugam as Nattuvanar

Reception 
The film was distributed by the General Film Distributing Co., which was based in Madras. According to Hari Krishnan, "there is no information about how Jalaja fared at the box office. Regardless, the success of the film provides us with new perspectives on thinking about the ways in which Bharatanatyam was circulating in the period [during the 1930s] immediately following the work of the [Madras] Music Academy and [Rukmini Devi] Arundale." In an August 1938 Filmindia magazine, Baburao Patel reports that, "Jalaja failed to draw and people in town think that it was due to bad direction. The story is reported to be weak and a bad selection of artistes is also given as a reason." In September of the same year, Patel continues with, "the original Jalaja is now expected to be revived after a number of changes." No print of the film is known to survive, making it a lost film.

Notelist

References 

1930s Tamil-language films
1938 films
1938 lost films
Indian black-and-white films
Indian dance films
Lost Indian films